Anna Bossman (born 1 December 1957) is a Ghanaian human rights advocate. She was formerly the director for the Integrity and Anti-Corruption Department of the African Development Bank (AfDB). In 2017 she was appointed Ghana's ambassador to France.

Education 

Born in Kumasi, Ghana, to Dr Jonathan Emmanuel Bossman, former Ghana' representative at United Nations in Geneva,  and Alice Decker. Anna Bossman attended Holy Child School in Cape Coast, going on to Achimota School for her high-school education. She graduated from the University of Ghana, Legon with a Law and Political Science degree and from the Ghana School of Law in 1980, being called to the Ghana Bar that year.

Career 
After serving as an Assistant State Attorney in Ghana's Ministry of Justice, Bossman went into private practice, and over the subsequent 25 years would pursue a career in the oil and gas industry and energy sector, working with major international companies including Tenneco) in Gabon (where she was the first woman secretary-general of the Gabonese Union of Petroleum Companies), Congo, Cote d'Ivoire, Angola, as well as in Ghana, where in 1996 she founded Bossman Consultancy Limited to provide support to power utilities and energy sectors, international institutions and donor agencies as well as private companies and business investors.

She was Deputy Commissioner of Ghana's Commission on Human Rights and Administrative Justice (CHRAJ) from 2002 to 2010, where she was appointed Acting Commissioner.

In July 2011, she was employed by the African Development Bank Group as Director of the Integrity and Anti-Corruption Department, in charge of investigations of fraud, corruption and other malpractices.

Diplomatic career 
In June 2017 she was appointed Ghana's ambassador to France, and presented her letters of credence to French President Emmanuel Macron on 13 October 2017. She was also Ghana's ambassador to Portugal and her country's permanent representative to UNESCO.

Personal life 
She was formerly married to Burkina Faso's former prime ministerial candidate, Pierre-Claver Damiba; and they had a daughter.

Selected awards 

2008 – Ghana Women's achievers Award for excellence in Human Rights and the Law (Ghana National Honorary Awards of Fame)

References

External links 
 linkedIn page

1957 births
Living people
Alumni of Achimota School
Ambassadors of Ghana to France
Ghanaian human rights activists
Women human rights activists
University of Ghana alumni
Ghana School of Law alumni
20th-century Ghanaian lawyers
Ghanaian women lawyers
New Patriotic Party politicians
Ghanaian women ambassadors
Alumni of Holy Child High School, Ghana
People from Kumasi
21st-century Ghanaian lawyers